The 1931–32 South Africa tour of Britain and Ireland was a collection of friendly rugby union games undertaken by the South Africa national team against the four British Home Nation teams. The tour also took in several matches against British and Irish club, county and invitational teams. This was the fourth South Africa tour and the third tour of the Northern Hemisphere.

The tour was extremely successful for the South Africans, as the team only lost a single match. In the tests played the team beat all four home nations. The only team to beat the Springboks was the invitational East Midlands county team. The final tour record saw 26 matches played, with South Africa winning 23, losing one and drawing two.

Criticism of playing style
Although very successful on the pitch, the touring South Africans were unloved by their hosts and the press back home. Bennie Osler, the South African captain, introduced a style of play which centred on a continual kicking game; either into touch in an attempt to support his large pack or diagonally across the pitch for his wings to chase. This was seen by many critics of the time as 10-man tactics, with the backs taken out of the match, and thus the entertainment brought by previous South African tours removed.

Welsh journalist 'Old Stager' stated "The Africans, by adherence to ten-man rugby, are winning their matches, but are not capturing the hearts and the imagination of rugby followers...". O.L. Owen in his History of the RFU concurred with these thoughts, "The least spectacular and, so far as back play was concerned, the most disappointing of the South African touring sides..."

Results

Touring party

Management
Manager: Theo Pienaar
Captain: Bennie Osler

Full backs
Gerry Brand (Western Province)
J.C. Tindall (Western Province)

Three-quarters
B.G. Gray (Western Province)
J.A. van Niekerk (Western Province)
F.D. Venter (Transvaal)
F.W. Waring (Western Province)
J.C. van der Westhuizen (Western Province)
J.H. van der Westhuizen (Western Province)
J. White (Border)
M Zimerman (Western Province)

Half backs
Danie Craven (Western Province)
M.G. Francis (Orange Free State)
Bennie Osler (Western Province)
P. de Villiers (Western Province)

Forwards
W.F. Bergh (South Western Districts)
J.N. Bierman (Transvaal)
G.M. Daneel (Transvaal)
John Dold (Eastern Province)
H.M. Forrest (Transvaal)
V. Geere (Transvaal)
H.G. Kipling (Griqualand West)
M.M. Louw (Western Province)
S.C. Louw (Western Province)
J.A.J. McDonald (Western Province)
A.J. van der Merwe (Western Province)
P.J. Mostert (Western Province)
P.J. Nel
L.C. Strachan (Transvaal)
S.R. du Toit (Western Province)

The matches

Newport

Newport: WA Everson, Jack Morley (capt.), K Richards, JR Edwards, K Watkins, Dicky Ralph, R Tovey, JC Slade, J Hughes, JA Addison, Harry Peacock, R Newton, DA Jones, P Hordern, Sam Danahar

South Africa: GH Brand, M Zimerman, JH van der Westhuizen, JC van der Westhuizen, FW Wearing, BL Osler, P de Villiers, MM Louw, PJ Mostert, SC Louw, JN Bierman, SR du Toit, PJ Nel, AJ van der Merwe, GM Daneel

Swansea

Swansea: Iorrie Herbert, Rhys Evans, Jack Rees (capt.), Claude Davey, Jim Dark, Dennis Manley, Idwal Rees, Bryn Evans, Tom Day, Glyn Jones, Gwynfor Lewis, Dai Thomas, Will Davies, Joe White, Edgar Long

South Africa: JC Tindall, JH van der Westhuizen, JC van der Westhuizen (capt.), FW Wearing, GH Brand, MG Francis, DH Craven, MM Louw, HG Kipling, SC Louw, AJ van der Merwe, V Geere, HM Forrest, GM Daneel, JAJ McDonald

Abertillery and Cross Keys

Abertillery/Cross Keys: Jimmy O'Neill (Abertillery) (capt.), Jim Bird (Abertillery), George Thompson (Cross Keys), Gerald Lewis (Cross Keys), JR Davies (Cross Keys), Syd Watkins (Cross Keys), Albert Hockey (Abertillery), Mel Meek (Abertillery), Lonza Bowdler (Cross Keys), Ken Salmon (Cross Keys), Steve Morris (Cross Keys), Trevor Thomas (Abertillery), Eddie Lloyd (Abertillery), RT Probert (Cross Keys), Albert Fear (Abertillery)

South Africa: JC Tindall, JH van der Westhuizen, BG Gray, J White, M Zimmerman, BL Osler (capt.), DH Craven, PJ Mostert, HG Kipling, SR du Toit, V Geere, PJ Nel, LC Strachan, JB Dold, AJ van der Merwe

Glasgow

Leicestershire and East Midlands

Leicestershire and East Midlands:Bobby Barr (Leicester); Jeff Hardwicke (Leicester), Ralph Buckingham (Leicester), Charlie Brumwell (Bedford), Len Ashwell (Bedford); Charles Slow (Northampton), Bernard Gadney (Leicester); Henry Greenwood (Leicester), Doug Norman (Leicester), Ray Longland (Northampton), Thomas Harris (Northampton), Anthony Roncoroni (West Herts), William Weston (Northampton),  George Beamish (Leicester), Eric Coley (Northampton)
South Africa: Tindall; Venter, van der Westhuizen, Gray, Zimmerman; Francis, Craven; Louw, Mostert, du Toit, Nel, Strachan, Bierman, Dold, Daneel

Cardiff

Cardiff: Tommy Stone, Ronnie Boon, Graham Jones, Bernard Turnbull, John Roberts, Harry Bowcott (capt.), Maurice Turnbull, Tom Lewis, Don Tarr, Tom Gadd, Archie Skym, Viv Osmond, Colin Ross, Bob Barrell, Iorrie Isaacs

South Africa: GH Brand, M Zimerman, BG Gray, JC van der Westhuizen, D Owen Williams, BL Osler (capt.), P de Villiers, MM Louw, PJ Mostert, SR du Toit, AJ van der Merwe, WF Bergh, V Geere, JN Bierman, JAJ McDonald

Llanelli

Llanelli: Bryn Howells, Wattie Lewis, Sid Howells, Tom Evans, Horace Fairhurst, Dai John, Bert Jones, Bryn Evans, Jack Williams, Edgar Jones, Cliff Treharne, Alf Parker, Will Lang, Jim Lang, Ivor Jones (capt.)

South Africa: GH Brand, D Williams, BG Gray, JH van der Westhuizen, FW Waring, MM Louw (capt.), DH Craven, MG Francis, HG Kipling, V Geere, GM Daneel, PJ Nel, WF Bergh, JN Bierman, LC Strachan

Neath and Aberavon

Neath & Aberavon: Phil Lloyd (Neath), Dan Jones (Neath), Glyn Daniels (Neath), Gwyn Moore (Neath), Fred Nicholas (Aberavon), Wilf Selby (Aberavon), Tal Harris (Aberavon), Tom Arthur (Neath), Miah McGrath (Aberavon), Ned Jenkins (Aberavon), Walter Vickery (Aberavon), Gordon Hopkins (Neath), Arthur Lemon (Neath), Cyril Griffiths (Aberavon) (Capt.), Glyn Prosser (Neath)

South Africa: JC Tindall, M Zimerman, J White, JC van der Westhuizen, FD Venter, BL Osler (capt.), DH Craven, SR du Toit, HG Kipling, PJ Mostert, AJ van der Merwe, PJ Nel, WF Bergh, JB Dold, JAJ McDonald

Wales

Wales: Jack Bassett (Penarth) (capt.), Jack Morley (Newport), Claude Davey (Swansea), Frank Williams (Cardiff), Ronnie Boon (Cardiff), Dicky Ralph (Newport), Wick Powell (London Welsh), Tom Day (Swansea), Lonza Bowdler, (Cross Keys), Archie Skym (Cardiff), Ned Jenkins (Aberavon), Tom Arthur (Neath), Arthur Lemon (Neath), Watcyn Thomas (Swansea), Will Davies (Swansea)

South Africa: GH Brand, M Zimerman, BG Gray, J White, FD Ventor, DH Craven, PJ Mostert, BL Osler (capt.), HG Kipling, MM Louw, AJ van der Marwe, WF Bergh, PJ Nel, GM Daneel, JAJ McDonald

Ireland

Ireland: Major Egan, Edward Lightfoot, Eugene Davy, Morgan Crowe, Joxer Arigho, Laurence McMahon, Paul Murray, Hal Withers, Victor Pike, Jimmy Farrell, Jack Russell, Jack Siggins, Noel Murphy, George Beamish (c), Jamie Clinch

South Africa: Gerry Brand, Morris Zimerman, Franky Waring, C van der Westhuizen, Ponie van der Westhuizen, Bennie Osler (c), Danie Craven, Boy Louw, Bert Kipling, Phil Mostert, Flip Nel, Ferdie Bergh, Nick Bierman, Andre McDonald, George Daneel

England

Scotland

Bibliography

References

South Africa tour
South Africa tour
South Africa national rugby team tours of Europe
Rugby union tours of England
Rugby union tours of Ireland
Rugby union tours of Scotland
Rugby union tours of Wales
Rugby union tour
Rugby union tour
tour
tour
tour
tour
tour